Jean Templeton Ward, Lady Ward CBE DStJ (  Reid; 13 July 1884 – 1 May 1962) was an American-born philanthropist and society hostess.  The only daughter of Whitelaw Reid, the American Ambassador to the United Kingdom, she lived in London after her marriage to Sir John Hubert Ward, second son of the William Ward, 1st Earl of Dudley.

Early life
Ward was a daughter of Whitelaw Reid and Elisabeth (née Mills) Reid (1857–1931), Her older brother was New York publisher Ogden Mills Reid, who married Helen Miles Rogers.  Her father served as the U.S. Minister to France (under President Benjamin Harrison) and as U.S. Ambassador to the United Kingdom (under Presidents Theodore Roosevelt and William Howard Taft) until his death in 1912.  Her parents were social people known for throwing lavish parties, including a musicale at their residence in Manhattan, at Madison Avenue and 50th Street, for 400 people, in 1901. Shortly before her father's death, he hosted the Duke and Duchess of Connaught at his New York home.

Her maternal grandparents were financier Darius Ogden Mills and Jane Templeton (née Cunningham) Mills. Her maternal uncle was financier and Thoroughbred racehorse owner Ogden Mills.  Her cousins included Gladys Livingston Mills (wife of Henry Carnegie Phipps), Beatrice Mills (wife of Bernard Forbes, 8th Earl of Granard), Ogden Livingston Mills (the 50th United States Secretary of the Treasury who married Margaret Stuyvesant Rutherfurd).

Personal life
Ward’s engagement to the 38-year-old Hon. Sir John Hubert Ward (1870–1938), was announced in April 1908.  He was a son of William Ward, 1st Earl of Dudley and Georgina Ward, Countess of Dudley. His paternal grandfather was William Humble Ward, 10th Baron Ward and his maternal grandfather was Sir Thomas Moncreiffe, 7th Baronet.  They were married on 23 June 1908 at the Chapel Royal, St. James's Palace in a ceremony attended by King Edward VII and Queen Alexandra. The wedding was celebrated at Dorchester House, and was considered one of the greatest society events of the year. Together, the couple had two sons:   Together, they were the parents of:

 Edward John Sutton Ward  (1909–1990), who married Margaret Susan Corbett in 1934. After her death in 1981, he married Marion Elizabeth Jessie Clover, the former wife of William Romilly, 4th Baron Romilly, in 1986. His godfather was King Edward VII.
 Alexander Reginald Ward (1914–1987), a Justice of the Peace for Berkshire between 1941 and 1947, who married Ilona Hollos in 1946. They divorced in 1959 and he married Zena Moyra Marshall in 1967. They divorced 1969 and he married Constance Cluett Sage.

Ward was an "accomplished horsewoman... excellent musician" and fluent in several languages including German and Italian. In 1912, Sir John paid £10,000 for Dudley House, a 44,000 square foot London townhouse that was built for his ancestor, the 6th Baron Ward.  The house, where the Wards hosted the King and Queen in 1914, was bombed during the War. The Wards also had a country estate, known as Chilton, in Hungerford, Berkshire.  For her charitable work during World War II, Lady Ward was made a Commander of the British Empire and was a Dame of the Order of St. John of Jerusalem.

Sir John died at their home, Dudley House in London, on 2 December 1938.  Lady Ward died in May 1962.

References
Notes

Sources

External links
Jean Templeton Ward (née Reid) at the National Portrait Gallery, London
Codicils to the will of the Hon. Jean Templeton Ward (Lady Ward), CBE of Chilton, Hungerford, Berks. Dudley House, London and Kinnaird, Ballinluig, Perthshire at The National Archives

1884 births
1962 deaths
Jean Templeton
Jean Templeton
American emigrants to England
Naturalised citizens of the United Kingdom
American socialites
British socialites
British people of American descent
Gilded Age
People from Manhattan
Commanders of the Order of the British Empire
Wives of knights